Bana is a village situated in Bikaner district in Rajasthan, India. It is situated 10 km south of Sri Dungargarh city. It was founded by Bana (clan) Jats.

Bana village is inhabited by Bana (clan) Jats only. There are 550 families of Bana Jats living in this village. There is only one family of Bhambu gotra living in the village. They migrated from Jaleu village in Ratangarh tehsil in Churu district.
And 12 families of NAIN gotra living in BANA. They are related from jetasar village of shridungargarh tehsil. 
Villages in Bikaner district